Vietnam's Next Top Model, Cycle 5 is the fifth season of Vietnam's Next Top Model. It began on VTV on November 1, 2014. Males were still featured as part of the show.

The former host, Xuan Lan, who hosted cycles two and three, returned to fulfill her position as head judge of the panel. Samuel Hoang was also introduced, as a new judge. Adam Williams became a permanent judge.

There were two winners, 18-year-old Nguyễn Thị Oanh from Quảng Ninh and 20-year-old Tạ Quang Hùng from Gia Lai.

Che Nguyen Quynh Chau competed in Miss Universe Vietnam 2015 (top 15) and Miss World Vietnam 2016 (top 5).

Tieu Ngoc Linh competed in Miss Universe Vietnam 2017 (top 5)

Lê Thị Kim Dung and Cao Thị Ngân both competed in the All-stars season of this series. Cao Ngân was placed fifth and twelfth-placer Lê Thị Kim Dung later claimed victory as the winner of cycle 8 All-Stars.

Overview

Requirements
All applying contestants for the show had to meet the following requirements:
 Young men and women had to be Vietnamese citizens or foreigners of Vietnamese origin.
 Be between the ages of 18-25 
 Meet a minimum height requirement of 170 cm (for women) and 175 cm (for men) 
 Not be managed exclusively by companies, agencies, or products. 
 Have no criminal record

Auditions

Next top model Online
This year, the organizers of the show began a contest named Next Top Model Online on Facebook. After the contest, the ten aspiring contestants with the highest number of votes were allowed to advance to the bikini round during casting week.

Prizes
The winner received the following prizes:
 A 1 billion VND contract with BeU Models
 The opportunity to appear on the cover of F Fashion Magazine along with a cash prize of 200 million VND
 A one-year exclusive contract Lumia worth 300 million VND, along with the free use of their latest mobile phones from Microsoft Devices
 A one-year contract with Canifa worth 200 million VND
 A prize of 100 million VND from Bourjois Paris Cosmetics
 Centurion card membership from California Fitness & Yoga Center worth 450 million VND

Contestants

Episode summaries

Episode 1
First aired: November 1, 2014

 Top 16: Hồ Văn Nam, Nguyễn Văn Thắng, Cao Thị Ngân, Chế Nguyễn Quỳnh Châu, Đặng Văn Hội, Lê Thị Kim Dung, Lê Đăng Khánh, Lê Đức Anh, Nguyễn Thị Oanh, Nguyễn Thị Thanh Tuyền, Phạm Công Toàn, Phạm Duy Anh, Phạm Tấn Khang, Tiêu Ngọc Linh, Tiêu Ngọc Linh, Trần Yến Nhi, Tạ Quang Hùng

Episode 2
First aired: November 8, 2014

First call-out: Nguyễn Thị Oanh 
Bottom Four: Đặng Văn Hội, Hồ Văn Năm, Nguyễn Văn Thắng & Phạm Duy Anh	
Eliminated: Hồ Văn Năm &  Nguyễn Văn Thắng

Episode 3
First aired: November 15, 2014

First call-out: Phạm Tấn Khang & Trần Yến Nhi	
Bottom Four: Cao Thị Ngân, Đặng Văn Hội, Tạ Quang Hùng & Nguyễn Thị Thanh Tuyền	
Eliminated: Nguyễn Thị Thanh Tuyền

Episode 4
First aired: November 22, 2014

First call-out: Phạm Công Toàn	
Bottom Three: Phạm Tấn Khang, Lê Thị Kim Dung & Lê Đức Anh	
Eliminated: Lê Đức Anh

Episode 5
First aired: November 29, 2014

First call-out: Phạm Tấn Khang
Bottom Two: Trần Yến Nhi & Lê Thị Kim Dung
Eliminated: Lê Thị Kim Dung

Episode 6
First aired: December 13, 2014

First call-out: Tạ Quang Hùng	 
Bottom Three: Phạm Công Toàn, Trần Yến Nhi & Chế Nguyễn Quỳnh Châu	 
Eliminated: Phạm Công Toàn & Trần Yến Nhi

Episode 7
First aired: December 20, 2014

First call-out: 	Tiêu Ngọc Linh 
Bottom Four: Chế Nguyễn Quỳnh Châu, Lê Đăng Khánh, Phạm Tấn Khang & Tạ Quang Hùng	 
Eliminated: Chế Nguyễn Quỳnh Châu & Lê Đăng Khánh

Episode 8
First aired: December 27, 2014

First call-out: 	Tiêu Ngọc Linh 
Bottom Two: Cao Thị Ngân & Phạm Tấn Khang	 
Eliminated: Phạm Tấn Khang

Episode 9
First aired: January 3, 2015

First call-out: Tiêu Ngọc Linh & Phạm Duy Anh
Bottom Two: Nguyễn Thị Oanh & Đặng Văn Hội
Originally eliminated: Nguyễn Thị Oanh

Episode 10
First aired: January 10, 2015

First call-out: Phạm Duy Anh	
Bottom Three: Tiêu Ngọc Linh, Nguyễn Thị Oanh & Đặng Văn Hội	
Eliminated: Nguyễn Thị Oanh & Đặng Văn Hội
Saved: Nguyễn Thị Oanh

Episode 11
First aired: January 17, 2015

Final Five: Cao Thị Ngân, Nguyễn Thị Oanh, Phạm Duy Anh, Tạ Quang Hùng & Tiêu Ngọc Linh
Eliminated: Cao Thị Ngân, Phạm Duy Anh & Tiêu Ngọc Linh
Final Two:  Nguyễn Thị Oanh & Tạ Quang Hùng
Vietnam's Next Top Model 2014: Tạ Quang Hùng & Nguyễn Thị Oanh

Summaries

Call-out order

 The contestant was eliminated
 The contestant was originally eliminated from the competition but was saved 
 The contestants won the competition

 In episode 1, the call-out did not reflect on the model's performance that week.
 In episode 3, the models were called in pairs, with the exception of the bottom two.
 In episode 9, Anh P. and Linh received first call-out as a pair. Oanh was originally eliminated when she landed in the bottom two with Hội. The judges decided to keep her in the competition
 In episode 10, both Oanh and Hội were eliminated when they landed in the bottom three with Linh. Once again, Oanh was spared from being eliminated.
 In episode 11, both Hùng and Oanh declared as the winners.

Average  call-out order
Episode 1 is not included

Photo Shoot Guide
Episode 1 Photo Shoot: Promotional Photos
Episode 2 Photo Shoot: Futuristic Fashion
Episode 3 Photo Shoot: Ballet Couples with Colored Powder
Episode 4 Photo Shoot: Urban Skating
Episode 5 Photo Shoot: Editorial with Sheep
Episode 6 Photo Shoot: Tribal Beauty
Episode 7 Photo Shoots: Denim in a Jean Factory; Luxury Editorial
Episode 8 Photo Shoot: Air Asia print ads
Episode 9 Commercials: TVC for CANIFA
Episode 10 Photo Shoot: Hanging from a Skyscraper

Judges
 Nguyễn Xuân Lan (host)
 Đinh Nam Trung
 Adam Williams
 Hương Color

References

External links
Official website

Vietnam's Next Top Model
2010s Vietnamese television series
2014 Vietnamese television seasons
2015 Vietnamese television seasons